Bangladesh Satellite Company Limited (BSCL) is a Bangladesh Government owned company formed with the aim to operate the country's first satellite, the Bangabandhu Satellite-1. This company is chaired by Shahjahan Mahmood, who was previously the chairman of the Bangladesh Telecommunication Regulatory Commission. The managing director of BCSCL is Md. Saiful Islam, Additional Secretary, Posts & Telecommunications Division, Bangladesh.

History 
Bangladesh Satellite Company Limited was established on 15 August 2017. The company had been authorized a capital of 50 billion BDT and paid capital of five billion BDT. The decision to form the company was approved at a Cabinet of Bangladesh meeting in July 2017. The company is owned and managed by the government of Bangladesh. Currently there are in total 35 employees including Managing Director & Company Secretary. The Bangabandhu Satellite 1 was launched in a joint collaboration with French company, Thales Alenia Space. It is the first satellite owned and operated by Bangladesh. Thales Alenia Space has built ground control stations in Gazipur and Rangamati Districts for the satellite operation.

References

External links
 Official Website of Bangladesh Satellite Company Limited, BCSCL

Government-owned companies of Bangladesh
2017 establishments in Bangladesh
Communications in Bangladesh
Companies based in Dhaka
Government-owned telecommunications companies
Ministry of Posts, Telecommunications and Information Technology